The 2000 NBL season was the 19th season of the National Basketball League. Only one change occurred heading into the 2000 season, with the Hawke's Bay Hawks returning to the league after a one-year hiatus to replace the outgoing Taranaki, who withdrew due to financial concerns. Palmerston North were also on the brink of collapse, but they secured a sponsorship deal at the last minute to ensure their participation. The Auckland Rebels won the championship in 2000 to claim their seventh league title.

Summary

Regular season standings

Playoff bracket

Awards

Statistics leaders
Stats as of the end of the regular season

Regular season
 NZ Most Valuable Player: Tony Rampton (Nelson Giants)
 Most Outstanding Guard: Tony Brown (Waikato Warriors)
 Most Outstanding NZ Guard: Tony Brown (Waikato Warriors)
 Most Outstanding Forward: Tony Rampton (Nelson Giants)
 Most Outstanding NZ Forward/Centre: Tony Rampton (Nelson Giants)
 Scoring Champion: Troy Coleman (Hawke's Bay Hawks)
 Rebounding Champion: Tony Rampton (Nelson Giants)
 Assist Champion: Shaun McCreedy (Hawke's Bay Hawks)
 Rookie of the Year: Arthur Trousdell (Canterbury Rams)
 Coach of the Year: Tracy Carpenter (North Harbour Kings)
 All-Star Five:
 G: Tony Brown (Waikato Warriors)
 G: Terrence Lewis (Wellington Saints)
 F: Purnell Perry (North Harbour Kings)
 F: James Hamilton (Nelson Giants)
 C: Tony Rampton (Nelson Giants)

References

External links
2000 award winners
2000 season preview
Basketball: TV adds bounce to basketball
Basketball: Punters may take a slam-dunking on close finals

National Basketball League (New Zealand) seasons